Limont Castle is a 13th-century keep (donjon) in the ancienne commune of Limont, in the municipality of Donceel, Liège Province, Wallonia, Belgium.  The keep, which served as the fortified residence for Robert de Limont, the first lord of the area, included a front entry raised to the second level (see image) to provide an extra security precaution in case of attack.

References

See also
List of castles in Belgium

Castles in Belgium
Castles in Liège Province